A. Clifford Jones (February 13, 1921 - October 9, 1996) was an American politician who served in the Missouri Senate and the Missouri House of Representatives.  He served in the U.S. Navy during World War II from 1942 until 1946, in the Atlantic, Pacific, and Indian oceans.  Jones was appointed city clerk of Ladue, Missouri, from 1948 until 1950.  He elected to the Missouri House of Representatives in 1950, serving until 1958 when he was the Republican nominee for St. Louis County supervisor.  He served as Missouri Senate Republican floor leader from 1971 to 1976.

Jones died of cancer on October 9, 1996.  His body was donated to the Washington University School of Medicine.

References

1921 births
1996 deaths
United States Navy personnel of World War II
Republican Party members of the Missouri House of Representatives
Republican Party Missouri state senators
United States Navy sailors
20th-century American politicians
Washington University in St. Louis alumni